Patuakhali Airport is an airfield in Patuakhali District, Barisal Division, in the south of Bangladesh. It was built to serve the tourist attraction of Kuakata, and it provided significant assistance with flood relief after Cyclone Sidr in 2007.

Currently, it is one of the unused airports of Bangladesh. It was not fully constructed because of insufficient funds of the Bangladesh government. But as the pressure of tourists seeking to visit Kuakata has increased, the Patuakhali authorities have been considering completing the construction of the airport. It is currently under the control of the Bangladesh Navy, for which it serves as an emergency runway, but in the future it could be used as civilian airport.

References 

Defunct airports in Bangladesh
Airports in Bangladesh